Enoplometopus occidentalis, the red reef lobster, Hawaiian reef lobster, or hairy reef lobster, is a reef lobster, native to the Indo-Pacific Ocean. It is in the family Enoplometopidae.

References 

Decapods
Crustaceans described in 1840